Mayer Carl Freiherr von Rothschild (5 August 1820 – 16 October 1886) was a German Jewish banker and politician, as well as scion of the Rothschild family.

Early life
Born in Naples on 5 August 1820. He was a son of Adelheid (née Herz) and Carl Mayer von Rothschild. Among his siblings were Charlotte (wife of Lionel de Rothschild), Wilhelm Carl (1828–1901), and Anselm Alexander Carl, who died young.

He studied law at the University of Göttingen and the University of Berlin.

Career
After studying law, he joined the family banking firm in Frankfurt. Following the deaths of his father and uncle (Amschel Mayer Rothschild), Mayer Carl and his brother Wilhelm Carl von Rothschild became heads of the firm.

In 1854, the firm was made Banker to the Court of Prussia. He was appointed the Duchy of Parma consulship in Frankfurt, Consul of Bavaria and Austrian Consul-General and, in 1866, he took part in a Frankfurt delegation to Berlin to demand a reduction in the contribution to the war effort, was a deputy in the North German Diet, a member of the German Reichstag and took a seat on the Frankfurt city parliament.

In 1871, Rothschild became the first Jewish member of the House of Lords of Prussia.

Personal life
On 6 April 1842, Rothschild married his cousin  at the London synagogue in Duke's Place. Together, the couple had seven daughters:

  (1843–1922), married to Salomon James de Rothschild (1835–1864) in 1862.
 Emma Louise von Rothschild (1844–1935), married to Nathan Mayer Rothschild (1840–1915) in 1867.
 Clementine Henriette von Rothschild (1845–1865)
 Thérèse von Rothschild (1847–1931), married to James Edouard de Rothschild (1844–1881) in 1871.
  (1850–1892).
 Bertha Clara von Rothschild (1862–1903), married to Louis Philippe Marie Alexandre Berthier, 3rd Prince of Wagram (1836–1911), a son of Napoléon Alexandre Berthier, 2nd Prince of Wagram, in 1882.

Rothschild died on 16 October 1886.

References

External links

1820 births
1886 deaths
German bankers
19th-century German Jews
Mayer Carl
Members of the Prussian House of Lords
Burials at the Old Jewish Cemetery, Frankfurt